The 2014–15 Ligue Magnus season was the 94th season of the Ligue Magnus, the top level of ice hockey in France. Rapaces de Gap defeated Dauphins d'Épinal in the championship round.

Regular season

References

1
Fra
Ligue Magnus seasons